Ken Fleet is a former association football player who represented New Zealand at international level.

Fleet made his full All Whites debut in a 0-2 loss to New Caledonia on 19 September 1951 and ended his international playing career with six A-international caps and three goals to his credit, his final cap an appearance in a 6-4 win over Fiji on 7 October 1951.

References 

Year of birth missing (living people)
Living people
New Zealand association footballers
New Zealand international footballers
Association football midfielders